Thaumatocyprididae is a family of ostracods in the order Halocyprida which contains seven genera and one subfamily. It first appeared in the Lopingian Epoch, 259.9 million years ago.

Genera and subfamilies 

 Subfamily †Pokornyopsinae Kozur, 1974 
 Genus †Pokornyopsis Kozur, 1974 
 Genus Danielopolina Kornicker & Sohn, 1976
 Genus Humphreysella Kornicker & Danielopol in Kornicker, Danielopol & Humphreys, 2006
 Genus Thaumatoconcha Kornicker & Sohn, 1976
 Genus Thaumatocypris Mueller, 1906
 Genus Thaumatomma Kornicker & Sohn, 1976
 Genus Welesina Iglikowska & Boxshall, 2013

References 

Ostracod families
Halocyprida